This is the solo discography for American alternative rock/power pop musician Matthew Sweet.

Albums

Studio albums

Compilation albums

Extended plays

Singles

Notes

Contributions
 In 1985, Sweet contributed a cover of the dB's "Ask for Jill" (with Don Dixon and Chris Stamey) for the Hoboken anthology, Luxury Condos Coming to Your Neighborhood Soon.
 In 1991, Sweet contributed bass guitar to a cover of Leonard Cohen's "Chelsea Hotel" (recorded by Lloyd Cole) for the tribute album I'm Your Fan: The Songs of Leonard Cohen, as well as contributing to other Cole albums throughout the 1990s.
 In 1992, Sweet contributed the song "Silent City" for the film Buffy the Vampire Slayer.
 In 1993, Sweet contributed the song "Superdeformed" for the benefit album No Alternative (the music video for this song was featured on an episode of the show Beavis and Butthead). Also that year, Sweet contributed a cover of Victoria Williams's song "This Moment" for another benefit, Sweet Relief: A Benefit for Victoria Williams.
 In 1994, Sweet contributed a cover of The Carpenter's "Let Me Be The One" for the tribute album If I Were A Carpenter.
 In 1995, Sweet contributed a cover of "Scooby-Doo, Where Are You?" for the tribute album Saturday Morning: Cartoons' Greatest Hits. Also that year, Sweet contributed the song "Everything Changes" for the film The Baby-Sitters Club, the song "Ultrasuede" for the film National Lampoon's Senior Trip and the song "My Pet" for the film Ace Ventura: When Nature Calls.
 In 1996, Sweet contributed the song "Happiness" for the film Kids in the Hall: Brain Candy, the song "Dark Secret" for the film The Craft, and the song "Swan Song" for the film Bed of Roses. Also that year, Sweet contributed bass guitar to the Fastball song "Are You Ready for the Fallout?" on their debut album.
 In 1997, Sweet contributed the song "Hollow" for the film The Game. Also that year, Sweet contributed the song "BBC" (with Mike Myers) for the film Austin Powers: International Man of Mystery, as well as appearing in the film itself.
 In 1998, Sweet contributed the song "Farther Down" for the film Can't Hardly Wait. Also that year, Sweet contributed a cover of Walter Egan's "Magnet & Steel" for the show Sabrina the Teenage Witch, and this cover was also featured in the film Overnight Delivery.
 In 1999, Sweet contributed the song "Faith in You" for the film Drive Me Crazy
 In 2000, Sweet contributed vocals and lyrics to Delerium's song "Daylight" on one of the band's albums.
 In 2002, Sweet contributed his song "Girlfriend" for the film Crossroads, He also contributed the song "Daddy Wasn't There" (with Mike Myers) for the film Austin Powers in Goldmember, as well as appearing in the film itself.
 In 2003, Sweet contributed the song "It Don't Matter to Me" for the film Ash Wednesday.
 In 2004, Sweet contributed the song "Cats Vs. Dogs" for the film Garfield: The Movie.
 In 2005, Sweet contributed a cover of Tom Petty's "American Girl" for High School Reunion: A Tribute To Those Great 1980's Films.
 In 2006, Sweet contributed the song "The Tide Is High" for the film How to Eat Fried Worms.
 In 2007, Sweet contributed the song "Come to California" for the film Nancy Drew, a cover of the Stone Poneys' "Different Drum" for the film The Heartbreak Kid, and the song Wild for the film The Bigtop.
 In 2009, Sweet contributed a cover of The Beatles' "Got to Get You Into My Life" for the film Imagine That.

References

Discographies of American artists
Discography